Willi Steputat (28 October 1888 – 17 October 1946) was a German wrestler. He competed in the middleweight event at the 1912 Summer Olympics.

References

External links
 

1888 births
1946 deaths
Olympic wrestlers of Germany
Wrestlers at the 1912 Summer Olympics
German male sport wrestlers
Sportspeople from Berlin